Khomajin may refer to:
 Khomajin, Famenin, Hamadan Province
 Khomajin, Hamadan